5α-Androst-2-en-17-one is an endogenous, naturally occurring, orally active anabolic-androgenic steroid (AAS) and a derivative of dihydrotestosterone (DHT). It is a metabolite of dehydroepiandrosterone (DHEA) in the body and is also a pheromone found in elephants and boars. 5α-Androst-2-en-17-one has been sold on the Internet as a "dietary supplement". It resembles desoxymethyltestosterone (17α-methyl-5α-androst-2-en-17β-ol) in chemical structure and may act as an androgen prohormone.

References 

Androgens and anabolic steroids
Androstanes
Ketones